Yvonne Chahín Sasso (born 26 December 1945) is a businesswoman from the Dominican Republic. She was elected by the Congress of the Dominican Republic as Senator for the Province of El Seibo, after the death on July 2010 of Senator-elect Manuel Ramón Antonio 'Lincoln' Jacobo Reyes (Mr. Jacobo was the father of Mrs. Chahín’s son-in-law).

References 

Living people
1945 births
People from El Seibo Province
Dominican Liberation Party politicians
Members of the Senate of the Dominican Republic
Dominican Republic people of Lebanese descent
White Dominicans
Women members of the Congress of the Dominican Republic
21st-century Dominican Republic women politicians
21st-century Dominican Republic politicians